Mucilaginibacter gracilis is a Gram-negative, facultatively aerobic, heterotrophic and non-motile bacterium from the genus of Mucilaginibacter which has been isolated from Sphagnum peat bog in the Tomsk Region in Russia.

References

External links
Type strain of Mucilaginibacter gracilis at BacDive -  the Bacterial Diversity Metadatabase	

Sphingobacteriia
Bacteria described in 2007